The code name Geronimo controversy came about after media reports that the U.S. operation to kill Osama bin Laden used the code name "Geronimo" to refer to either the overall operation, to fugitive bin Laden himself or to the act of killing or capturing bin Laden.

Press reports claimed that "Geronimo" was used in the raid to refer to bin Laden himself, but this was later contradicted by official sources. The official mission code name was Operation Neptune Spear (a reference to the trident in the SEAL insignia), with Jackpot as the code name for bin Laden as an individual and Geronimo as the code word for bin Laden's capture or death.  In the book No Easy Day, former SEAL Matt Bissonnette, who participated in the mission, states that "Geronimo" was the code name for bin Laden.

The historical Geronimo was the leader of the Chiricahua Apache who defied the U.S. government and eluded capture.

Channel 4 News said "According to some analysis today, the U.S. military chose the code name because bin Laden, like Geronimo, had evaded capture for years. If they were trying to avoid mythmaking, it seems they chose the wrong code name." Once bin Laden was killed, one of the commanders reported "Geronimo E-KIA", meaning that the mission had ended with the "Enemy Killed In Action".

Many Native Americans objected to the use of the name Geronimo. "It's how deeply embedded the 'Indian as enemy' is in the collective mind of America," said Suzan Shown Harjo, president of the Washington, D.C.-based Morning Star Institute, a Native American advocacy group. "There is little doubt [the] use of a leader like Geronimo to refer to bin Laden is ill-advised," wrote Keith Harper, an attorney and member of the Cherokee Nation, in an email with a reporter for The Washington Post.

The leaders of several American Indian tribes urged President Obama to retroactively rename the military code name "Geronimo" used by the SEALS during the killing of bin Laden.  Fort Sill Apache Tribal Chairman Jeff Houser sent a letter to President Obama, decrying the linking of "the legendary Apache warrior" to a "mass murder and cowardly terrorist...Unlike the coward Osama bin Laden, Geronimo faced his enemy in numerous battles and engagements. He is perhaps one of the greatest symbols of Native American resistance in the history of the United States." Questions to the White House about the code name were referred to the Defense Department, which stated no disrespect was meant and that code names are generally chosen at random. Navajo Nation President Ben Shelly told The Washington Times that "Even though the operation to capture or kill bin Laden is over...the name should be changed so that children don't encounter it in the history books."

The Onondaga Council of Chiefs said that the use of code name Geronimo perpetuates negative stereotypes about Indians. Nez Perce member Loretta Tuell, staff director and chief counsel for the Senate Indian Affairs Committee, said "These inappropriate uses of Native American icons and cultures are prevalent throughout our society, and the impacts to Native and non-Native children are devastating". Jeff Houser, chairman of Geronimo's Fort Sill Apache Tribe, wrote a letter to President Obama saying "We are quite certain that the use of the name Geronimo as a code for Osama bin Laden was based on misunderstood and misconceived historical perspectives of Geronimo and his armed struggle against the United States and Mexican governments".

Geronimo's great-grandson, Vietnam War veteran Harlyn Geronimo, issued a statement requesting explanations and apologies.

On 8 May 2011, President Obama was interviewed by 60 Minutes saying "There was a point before folks had left, before we had gotten everybody back on the helicopter and were flying back to base, where they said Geronimo has been killed, and Geronimo was the code name for bin Laden."

See also

 Stereotypes of indigenous peoples of Canada and the United States
 Geronimo (exclamation)

References

Killing of Osama bin Laden
2011 controversies
Obama administration controversies
Code name
Code names
Native American-related controversies
Anti-indigenous racism in the United States